The MTV Woodies (formerly known as the MTVU Woodie Awards) is an annual music show presented by MTVU with awards voted on by fans.

Ceremonies

Category

Woodie of the Year
2004: Modest Mouse - "Float On"
Anthony Hamilton - "Comin' from Where I'm From"
Death Cab for Cutie - "The New Year"
Jet - "Are You Gonna Be My Girl"
Yeah Yeah Yeahs - "Maps"
2005: My Chemical Romance
Arcade Fire
Common
Fall Out Boy
Gorillaz
2006: Angels & Airwaves
Atmosphere
Gym Class Heroes
Panic! at the Disco
The Academy Is...
2007: Gym Class Heroes
Amy Winehouse
Common
Lily Allen
The Shins
2008: Paramore
Lil Wayne
MGMT
Santigold
Tokyo Police Club
2009: Kings of Leon
Asher Roth
Drake
MGMT
Silversun Pickups
2011: Wiz Khalifa - "Black and Yellow"
Arcade Fire - "The Suburbs"
The Black Keys - "Tighten Up"
B.o.B & Hayley Williams - "Airplanes"
LCD Soundsystem - "Drunk Girls"
2012: Mac Miller
The Black Keys
Foster the People
Frank Ocean
J. Cole
Skrillex
2013: Machine Gun Kelly
ASAP Rocky
Edward Sharpe and the Magnetic Zeros
Fun
Grimes
Kendrick Lamar
Walk the Moon
2014: Drake
Disclosure
Imagine Dragons
Lorde
Pharrell Williams
Zedd
2015: Porter Robinson
Charli XCX
FKA Twigs
J. Cole
Run the Jewels
Sam Smith
2017: The Chainsmokers
Big Sean
Chance the Rapper
Childish Gambino
Solange Knowles
Twenty One Pilots

Breaking Woodie
2004: The Killers - "Somebody Told Me"
Atmosphere - "Trying to Find a Balance"
Butterfly Boucher "I Can't Make Me"
Robert Randolph and the Family Band - "I Need More Love"
Secret Machines - "Nowhere Again"
2005: Motion City Soundtrack
Matisyahu
Paul Wall
The Bravery
The Decemberists
2006: Plain White T's
Arctic Monkeys
Chamillionaire
Imogen Heap
Lupe Fiasco
2007: Boys Like Girls
Peter Bjorn and John
Rich Boy
Silversun Pickups
Tokyo Police Club
2008: Afterhour
All Time Low
Lykke Li
Tyga
We the Kings
2009: Never Shout Never
Grizzly Bear
Wale
La Roux
Friendly Fires
Passion Pit
2011: Two Door Cinema Club
Dev
Local Natives
Sleigh Bells
Wavves
2012: Machine Gun Kelly
ASAP Rocky
Azealia Banks
Charli XCX
Childish Gambino
Cloud Nothings
Cults
Electric Guest
Fake Problems
Fun
Future
Iggy Azalea
Kendrick Lamar
Meek Mill
Lana Del Rey
Porter Robinson
Sleeper Agent
Travis Mills
Tune-Yards
Walk the Moon
Wallpaper
The Weeknd
2013: Earl Sweatshirt
alt-J
Dillon Francis
Gold Fields
The Lumineers
Twenty One Pilots
Zedd
2014: The 1975
Arctic Monkeys
Jhené Aiko
Martin Garrix
Tristan Wilds
Sam Smith

Left Field Woodie
2004: N.E.R.D - "Maybe"
The Dresden Dolls - "Girl Anachronism"
Kenna - "Freetime"
Kinky - "Presidente"
The Streets - "Fit but You Know It"
2005: MewithoutYou
Arcade Fire
Matisyahu
M.I.A.
Saul Williams
2006: Gnarls Barkley
Gogol Bordello
Imogen Heap
Lady Sovereign
Wolfmother
2007: Madvillain
CSS
Klaxons
Rodrigo y Gabriela
The Knife
2008: Chromeo
The Cool Kids
No Age
She & Him
Yelle
2009: Tech N9ne
Amanda Black
Janelle Monáe
Major Lazer
Jay Reatard
2011: Kanye West
Das Racist
Die Antwoord
Lil B
Yelawolf

Good Woodie
2004: Sum 41
Beastie Boys
Coldplay
Death Cab for Cutie
Sean Combs
2005: U2
Coldplay
Common
David Banner
Kanye West
2006: Serj Tankian
Juvenile
Ludacris
Pearl Jam
Rise Against
2007: Guster
Alicia Keys
Linkin Park
The Red Jumpsuit Apparatus
Thom Yorke
2008: Jack's Mannequin
Eddie Vedder
Emmanuel Jal
Mary J. Blige
Ludacris
2009: Jamie Tworkowski
John Legend
Wyclef Jean
Kenna
Alicia Keys

Soundtrack of My Life Woodie
2004: Coheed and Cambria - In Keeping Secrets of Silent Earth: 3
Akon - Trouble
Franz Ferdinand - Franz Ferdinand
Jadakiss - Kiss tha Game Goodbye
The Postal Service - Give Up

The  Jump Woodie
2004: Taking Back Sunday - "A Decade Under the Influence"
Black Rebel Motorcycle Club - "Stop"
Nappy Roots - "Sick and Tired"
Something Corporate - "Space"
Sugarcult - "Memory"

The Silent but Deadly Woodie
2004: Modest Mouse - "Float On"
Kenna - "Freetime"
Mogwai - "Hunted by a Freak"
Reggie and the Full Effect - "Congratulations Smack and Katy"
Steriogram - "Walkie Talkie Man"

Road Woodie
2004: Coheed and Cambria
Jack Johnson
O.A.R.
Phish
The Roots
2006: Taking Back Sunday
Cartel
The Fray
Hellogoodbye
Nightmare of You

Streaming Woodie
2004: Fall Out Boy - "Grand Theft Autumn/Where Is Your Boy"
Coheed and Cambria - "A Favor House Atlantic"
Copeland - "Walking Downtown"
Madvillain - "All Caps"
O.A.R. - "Hey Girl"
2005: The Afters - "Beautiful Love"
Aberfeldy - "Love is an Arrow"
Alicia Keys - "Karma"
Death Cab for Cutie - "Title and Registration"
Eisley - "Telescope Eyes"
Gorillaz & De La Soul - "Feel Good Inc."
Hawthorne Heights - "Ohio Is for Lovers"
K'naan - "Soobax"
Matisyahu - "King Without a Crown"
Mike Jones, Paul Wall & Slim Thug - "Still Tippin'"
Modest Mouse - "Ocean Breathes Salty"
My Chemical Romance - "I'm Not Okay (I Promise)"
Straylight Run - "Existentialism on Prom Night"
Taking Back Sunday - "A Decade Under the Influence"
The Alchemist, Prodigy, Nina Sky & Illa Ghee - "Hold You Down"
The Postal Service - "Against All Odds (Take a Look at Me Now)"
The Unicorns - "Jellybones"
Usher & Alicia Keys - "My Boo"
2006 - O.A.R. - "Love and Memories"
The All-American Rejects - "Move Along"
Arctic Monkeys - "I Bet You Look Good on the Dancefloor"
Armor for Sleep - "The Truth About Heaven"
Atmosphere - "Say Hey There"
Cage & Daryl Palumbo - "Shoot Frank"
Death Cab for Cutie - "Crooked Teeth"
Gym Class Heroes & Patrick Stump - "Cupid's Chokehold"
Hellogoodbye - "Shimmy Shimmy Quarter Turn"
Imogen Heap - "Hide and Seek"
Matisyahu - "Youth"
Motion City Soundtrack - "Hold Me Down"
Nightmare of You - "I Want to Be Buried in Your Backyard"
Panic! at the Disco - "I Write Sins Not Tragedies"
Plain White T's - "Hey There Delilah"
Red Hot Chili Peppers - "Dani California"
Taking Back Sunday - "MakeDamnSure"
The Academy Is... - "Checkmarks"
The Academy Is... - "Slow Down"
The Fray - "Over My Head (Cable Car)"

Welcome Back Woodie
2004: Incubus
Beastie Boys
Dave Matthews Band
The Roots
Slum Village

Best Video Woodie
2005: Gorillaz - "Feel Good Inc." (Best Video Woodie - Animated)
Aberfeldy - "Love is an Arrow"
Aesop Rock - "Fast Cars"
Arcade Fire - "Neighborhood 3 (Power Out)"
Nine Inch Nails - "Only"
2005: Death Cab for Cutie - "Title and Registration" (Best Video Woodie - Live Action)
Jack Johnson - "Sitting, Waiting, Wishing"
My Chemical Romance - "Helena"
Nas & Olu Dara - "Bridging the Gap"
Nine Inch Nails - "Only"
2006: Gorillaz - "El Mañana" (Best Video Woodie - Animated)
Against Me! - "From Her Lips to God's Ears (The Energizer)"
Gnarls Barkley - "Crazy"
Mark Ronson & Alex Greenwald - "Just"
Psapp - "Hi"
2006: Thirty Seconds to Mars - "The Kill" (Best Video Woodie - Live Action)
Feist - "Mushaboom"
Jenny Lewis And The Watson Twins - "Rise Up with Fists!!"
Jurassic 5 & Dave Matthews - "Work It Out"
The Raconteurs - "Steady, As She Goes"
2007: Say Anything - "Wow, I Can Get Sexual Too"
Justice - "D.A.N.C.E."
Motion City Soundtrack - "Broken Heart"
RJD2 - "Work It Out"
TV on the Radio - "Province"
2008: Motion City Soundtrack - "It Had to Be You"
Adele - "Chasing Pavements"
Erykah Badu - "Honey"
Gnarls Barkley - "Who's Gonna Save My Soul"
Vampire Weekend - "Mansard Roof"
2009: Matt and Kim - "Lessons Learned"
The Dead Weather - "Treat Me Like Your Mother"
Death Cab for Cutie - "Grapevine Fires"
Anjulie - "Boom"
Yeah Yeah Yeahs - "Heads Will Roll"
Kid Cudi - "Day 'n' Nite"
2011: Chiddy Bang - "Opposite of Adults"
The Black Keys - "Tighten Up"
Duck Sauce - "Barbra Streisand"
Gorillaz, Bobby Womack & Mos Def - "Stylo"
Vampire Weekend - "Giving Up the Gun"
2012: Best Coast - "Our Deal"
Battles - "My Machines"
Duck Sauce - "Big Bad Wolf"
Gotye & Kimbra - "Somebody That I Used to Know"
M83 - "Midnight City"
Major Lazer & The Partysquad - "Original Don"
2013: Danny Brown - "Grown Up"
Best Coast - "The Only Place"
Chairlift - "Met Before"
Josh Tillman - "Hollywood Forever Cemetery Sings"
Major Lazer & Amber Coffman - "Get Free"
Of Monsters and Men - "Little Talks"
Skrillex & Sirah - "Bangarang"
2014: Chance the Rapper, Saba & BJ the Chicago Kid - "Everybody's Something"
Arcade Fire - "Afterlife"
Disclosure - "Grab Her!"
Passion Pit - "Carried Away"
Iggy Azalea - "Bounce"
2015: Childish Gambino - "Sober"
Bad Suns - "Salt"
Beyoncé - "7/11
FKA Twigs - "Pendulum"
Flying Lotus & Kendrick Lamar - "Never Catch Me"
Vic Mensa - "Down on My Luck"

International Woodie
2005: Muse
Akon
Arcade Fire
Bloc Party
Keane
2006: The Subways
Arctic Monkeys
Cham
Corinne Bailey Rae
Sia

Alumni Woodie
2005: Green Day
Beck
Coldplay
Common
Mos Def
2006: AFI
Fiona Apple
Ghostface Killah
Muse
Red Hot Chili Peppers
2007: Spoon
Bright Eyes
Modest Mouse
Talib Kweli
The Shins

Performing Woodie
2007: Muse
The Academy Is...
Daft Punk
Lil Wayne
The Rapture
2008: Atmosphere
Kanye West
N.E.R.D
Simian Mobile Disco
The Ting Tings
2009: Green Day
3OH!3
Animal Collective
Phoenix
P.O.S
2011: Matt and Kim
Girl Talk
Mumford & Sons
The National
Robyn
2012: Mac Miller
Alabama Shakes
The Black Keys
Jay-Z & Kanye West
Skrillex
Swedish House Mafia
2014: Ed Sheeran
Arcade Fire
Jay-Z
The National
Tyler, The Creator
The xx

Best Music On Campus Woodie
2007: Stella by Starlight
2008: The Bride Wore Black
2009: Hotel of the Laughing Tree

College Radio Woodie
2009: KUPS (University of Puget Sound)
2011: WVUM (University of Miami)
2012: WASU-FM (Appalachian State University)
2013: KSUA (University of Alaska)
2014: WESS (East Stroudsburg University)
2015: WPTS-FM (University of Pittsburgh)

EDM Effect Woodie
2012: Calvin Harris - "We Found Love"
Avicii - "Good Feeling"
Benny Benassi - "Beautiful People"
Flux Pavilion - "Who Gon Stop Me"
Laidback Luke & Steve Aoki - "Turbulence"
Martin Solveig & Kele Okereke - "Ready 2 Go"

Fomo Woodie
2013: The Weeknd
Death Grips
Fiona Apple
Flux Pavilion
Frank Ocean
Jack White
Swedish House Mafia

Tag Team Woodie
2013: Kimbra, Mark Foster & A-Trak - "Warrior"
A-Trak & Dillon Francis - "Money Makin'"
Kanye West, Big Sean, Pusha T & 2 Chainz - "Mercy"
Meek Mill & Drake - "Amen"
Morgan Page & Tegan and Sara - "Body Work"
Steve Aoki, Angger Dimas & Iggy Azalea - "Beat Down"
Swedish House Mafia VS Knife Party - "Antidote"

Branching Out Woodie
2013: Macklemore & Ryan Lewis
Amanda Palmer
Avicii
Dan Deacon
deadmau5
Jack White
The xx

Chevrolet Sonic Collage Artist Woodie
2013: The Lonely Biscuits
Kiah Victoria
Little Sur
The Madison Letter

Cover Woodie
2014: Bastille - "We Can't Stop" (Miley Cyrus)
The 1975
Arctic Monkeys
Low
Sam Smith
Vampire Weekend
2015: Taylor Swift - "Riptide" (Vance Joy)
Charli XCX - "Shake It Off" (Taylor Swift)
Ed Sheeran, Sia & Grouplove - "Drunk in Love" (Beyoncé)
Kiesza - "Take Me to Church" (Hozier)
Lorde - "Don't Tell 'Em" (Jeremih)
Sam Smith - "How Will I Know" (Whitney Houston)
2017: Ed Sheeran - "Touch" (Little Mix)
Chance the Rapper - "Ultralight Beam" (Kanye West)
Elle King - "Jealous" (Nick Jonas) / "Can't Feel My Face" (The Weeknd)
James Bay - "Hymn for the Weekend" (Coldplay)
MØ - "Love on the Brain" (Rihanna)
Panic! at the Disco - "Starboy" (The Weeknd)

Did it My Way Woodie
2014: Beyoncé
Arcade Fire
Bob Dylan
Childish Gambino
Kanye West

Best Collaboration Woodie
2014: ASAP Rocky, Skrillex & Birdy Nam Nam - "Wild for the Night"
Avicii & Aloe Blacc - "Wake Me Up"
Daft Punk & Pharrell Williams - "Get Lucky"
Imagine Dragons & Kendrick Lamar - "Radioactive (Remix)"
James Blake & Chance the Rapper - "Life Round Here"
Just Blaze, Baauer & Jay-Z - "Higher"

Artist to Watch
2015: Years & Years
James Bay
Kygo
MisterWives
Rae Sremmurd
Raury

Co-Sign Woodie
2015: Hoodie Allen & Ed Sheeran - "All About It"
Alesso & Tove Lo - "Heroes (We Could Be)"
Eminem, Royce da 5'9", Big Sean, Danny Brown, Dej Loaf & Trick-Trick - "Detroit vs. Everybody"
Fences & Macklemore & Ryan Lewis - "Arrows"
iLoveMakonnen & Drake - "Tuesday"
Jack Ü & Kiesza - "Take Ü There"

Next Level Performance Woodie
2015: Childish Gambino
Big Data
Drake & Lil Wayne
Sia
Skrillex

Social Climber Woodie
2015: Jack & Jack
DeStorm Power
Kenzie Nimmo
Lia Marie Johnson
Rajiv Dhall

Woodie to Watch
2017: Khalid
Anne-Marie
DRAM
Dua Lipa
Gallant
Lil Uzi Vert
Lil Yachty
Marshmello
Rag'n'Bone Man
Russ

Songwriter of the Year
2017: PartyNextDoor
Bibi Bourelly
Jack Antonoff
Starrah
Swae Lee
Wynter Gordon

References

External links
 

MTV
Awards established in 2004
2004 establishments in the United States
Popular culture